102 FM is a radio station on 102 MHz in Thessaloniki, Greece. It is owned by ERT3, a regional public television channel aimed at northern Greek audiences, and broadcasts news and talk programs.

First years
It was one of the three radio stations of Hellenic Broadcasting Corporation together with the Second Programme on 95.8 FM  and the Trito Programma Vrahea that used to broadcast across Greece and all the Greek Diaspora. 

The Radio Station of Macedonia was equipped with digital technology and operated until June 2013 when the Greek Government has decided to close down the Hellenic Broadcasting Corporation.

The first program broadcast on 102 FM was also carried on 1044 kilohertz in the medium wave band.

ERT 3 is based on Aggelaki 14 str, near the Thessaloniki International Fair.

11 June 2013 - 10 June 2015
On 11 June 2013, after the closure of ERT, the station continued broadcasting from the second frequency of ERA Sport Thessaloniki at 103.3 FM, under the name  'EPA Thessaloniki' . Since June 2015 the radio is operated by ERT known as ERT3 in Macedonia (102 FM) replacing NERIT Macedonia.

External links
Official Website
102 FM – Online webcast

Hellenic Radio
Radio stations established in 1988
Radio stations in Thessaloniki